Jack Abendschan (born December 18, 1942) is a former Canadian Football League offensive lineman and placekicker who played for the Saskatchewan Roughriders from 1965 through 1975.

Professional career
Jack Abendschan began his career with the Saskatchewan Roughriders in 1965 and remained with them throughout his 11-year CFL career. Abendschan played offensive guard and except for 1968, he played all 16 games of the regular season every year from 1965 to 1973.

Abendschan was also an accurate placekicker. His best field goal percentage was 63.2% (24 of 38) in 1970, his next best 60.7% (17 of 28) in 1967, which was considered very good at the time, considering kickers were not specialists then.

Abendschan was part of the 54th Grey Cup championship-winning Saskatchewan Roughriders in 1966 over the Ottawa Rough Riders 29-14, in which he converted their 4 touchdowns. He also played in the 55th Grey Cup the following year, the 57th Grey Cup of 1969, and the 60th Grey Cup of 1972, losses to the Hamilton Tiger-Cats in 1967 and 1972 and to Ottawa in 1969.

During Abendschan's time as a member of the Saskatchewan Roughriders, he was named to the CFL's All-Star team 5 times. In 2012, he was inducted into the Canadian Football Hall of Fame.

Videos

References

1942 births
Living people
Canadian Football Hall of Fame inductees
Canadian football offensive linemen
Canadian football placekickers
New Mexico Lobos football players
Players of Canadian football from San Francisco
Players of American football from San Francisco
Saskatchewan Roughriders players